The Oakland Model A was the first four-cylinder engine offered by the Oakland Motor Company in 1907 which became a division of General Motors in 1909. The Model A was developed and manufactured from former Oakland Motor Company sources while the engine was provided by Northway Motor and Manufacturing Division of GM of Detroit. The Model A was available in several body styles and prices ranged from US$1,300 ($ in  dollars ) to US$2,150 ($ in  dollars ). Once Oakland became a division of GM, Oldsmobile and Buick shared bodywork and chassis of their four-cylinder models with Oakland. Manufacture of the Oakland was completed in Pontiac, Michigan. Oakland (Pontiac) wouldn't use another 4-cylinder engine until 1961 with the Pontiac Trophy 4 engine.

History
The following year the Model A was renamed the Model 40 with a  wheelbase while the coachwork choices remained, and by 1910 the four-cylinder was installed in two different body styles with a choice of four different wheelbases with individual model names. The Model 24 roadster has a  wheelbase while the longer Model M roadster has a  wheelbase. The Touring Sedan came as Model 25 with a 100" wheelbase, the Model K had a 102" and the Model 33 with a 106" wheelbase.

For model years 1912 the choice of wheelbases offered were reduced to three and the naming conventions were standardized. The Model 30 used a 96" and was roadster or touring sedan. The Model 40 added a closed body coupe using a 112" and the Model 45 used 120" and offered only a four or seven passenger touring sedan or closed body limousine. Prices for the limousine were listed at US$3,000 ($ in  dollars ) which placed it as a competitor with Oldsmobile and Cadillac of the same year.

Model year 1913 saw a fourth choice wheelbase added. The choices were the Model 35 with a 112", the Model 42 with a 116", the Model 45 with a 120" and the Model 40 with a 214". The Model 45 Limousine was still listed at US$3,000 while the longest wheelbase was the Model 40 and was a touring sedan only.

1914 saw an elimination of a wheelbase choice with the Model 43 using a 116" and two closed body choices of a coupe or sedan or a touring sedan, the Model 35 and Model 36 both using a 112" and coachwork choices of roadster, cabriolet or touring sedan.

The last year a four-cylinder engine was offered was for 1915 and 1916 using a 112" wheelbase as the company switched to a straight-six, while the first Oakland V8 was offered in 1915, sourced from the Northway Engine Division of GM. As Oakland began to positioned as the entry-level GM product, prices for the Model 37 and Model 38 using a 112" wheelbase were documented at US$1,050 ($ in  dollars ) and offered a choice of touring sedan, roadster or speedster for the same price.

References

See also
Buick Model 10
Cadillac Model Thirty
Oldsmobile Series 22

1900s cars
First car made by manufacturer

Brass Era vehicles
1910s cars